Bernardus Philippus Wilhelmus Maria "Bart" Taminiau (born 27 March 1947) is a retired field hockey player from the Netherlands. He competed at the 1972 and 1976 Olympics, where his teams finished in fourth place on both occasions.

Between 1970 and 1978 Taminiau played 87 international matches and scored 4 goals, two of them at the 1973 World Cup, which was won by the Netherlands.

References

External links
 

1947 births
Living people
Dutch male field hockey players
Olympic field hockey players of the Netherlands
Field hockey players at the 1972 Summer Olympics
Field hockey players at the 1976 Summer Olympics
Sportspeople from Tilburg
20th-century Dutch people